S. Shivaram (28 January 1938 – 4 December 2021), popularly known simply as Shivaram or Shivaramanna, was an Indian actor, producer and director whose Kannada cinema career has spanned six decades. He has played roles including lead hero performances, character roles, comedic roles, as well as supporting parts. He teamed up with his elder brother, S. Ramanathan and produced several films under the name Rashi Brothers apart from directing Hrudaya Sangama in 1972. They together produced movies directed by Puttanna Kanagal like Gejje Pooje and Upasane. They also produced Dr. Rajkumar 's 175th movie Nanobba Kalla and the Tamil movie Dharma Durai starring Rajinikanth which was a remake of the 1989 Kannada movie Deva.
The brothers together produced few Bollywood films as well including the 1985 movie Geraftaar which is known to be the only Indian movie to star three stalwarts -   Amitabh Bachchan, Kamal Haasan and Rajinikanth - in a single movie. As an actor, Shivaram has the distinction of working with many stalwart directors out of which his association with Puttanna Kanagal is much remembered. He has acted in all the seven Kannada movies directed by Singeetam Srinivasa Rao starring Rajkumar.

Early life
Shivaram was born in a middle class Hindu Brahmin family in Choodasandra Village in Madras Presidency, a place bordering the Karnataka and Tamil Nadu states. After having his primary education completed, he moved to Bangalore city along with his elder brother Srikanteshwara, who was running, esteemed Vani typewriting & Commerce Institute. Influenced by the theater screenings of Gubbi Veeranna, Shivaram developed a strong liking towards the film-making and acting. He began to act in several stage plays and migrated to cinema in 1958 assisting various directors such as Ku. Ra. Seetharama Sastry. He also worked as a camera assistant to the veteran cinematographer Boman D. Irani.

Shivaram's first appearance as an actor on the silver screen was with Beratha Jeeva in 1965 directed and co-produced by K. R. Seetharama Sastry. Meanwhile, he was assisting various prominent directors like K. S. L. Swamy, Geethapriya, Singeetam Srinivasa Rao and Puttanna Kanagal.

Career
After his stint as the assistant director from 1958 through 1965, he got his acting break in supporting role in Seetharama Shastry's Beretha Jeeva starring Kalyan Kumar. From then on, he acted with almost all the directors of the 1970s and 1980s through 2000s. Some of his most memorable performances as a character actor include Sharapanjara, Naagarahaavu, Shubhamangala; all of which are directed by Puttanna Kanagal. His comic roles were appreciated in many films such as Chalisuva Modagalu, Shravana Banthu, Haalu Jenu, Hombisilu, Hosa Belaku, Guru Shishyaru, Simhada Mari Sainya, Makkala Sainya to name a few. He appeared in the lead role in Driver Hanumanthu (1980) which was also co-produced by him. Post 2000 year, he switched to character roles performing in major blockbusters such as Apthamitra , Huchcha and parallel cinemas such as Bara and Thaayi Saheba. He also acted in television series Grihabhanga, directed by Girish Kasaravalli and Baduku directed by Ravikiran.

Associating with his brother, S. Ramanathan and forming a home production named "Rashi Brothers", Shivaram co-produced many of the blockbuster and critically acclaimed movies such as Gejje Pooje (1970), Upasane (1974), Nanobba Kalla (1979), Driver Hanumanthu (1980) and Bahala Chennagide (2001).

Death 
Shivaram died from brain haemorrhage on 4 December 2021 at the age of 83 in a private hospital in Bangalore.

Filmography

As director

As producer

As actor (partial)

 Beratha Jeeva (1965)
 Mavana Magalu (1965)
 Dudde Doddappa (1966)
 Sri Purandara Dasaru (1967)
 Lagna Pathrike (1967)
 Namma Makkalu (1969)
 Anireekshita (1970)
 Mukti (1970)
 Sharapanjara (1971)
 Mukthi (1971)
 Bhale Adrushtavo Adrushta (1971)
 Sipayi Ramu (1972)
 Naagarahaavu (1972)
 Naa Mechida Huduga (1972)
 Hrudaya Sangama (1972)
 Mooruvare Vajragalu (1973)
 Edakallu Guddada Mele (1973)
 Upasane (1974)
 Bangaarada Panjara (1974)
 Hennu Samsarada Kannu (1975)
 Shubhamangala (1975)
 Onde Roopa Eradu Guna (1975)
 Devara Gudi (1975)
 Hudugatada Hudugi (1976)
 Mangalya Bhagya (1976)
 Besuge (1976)
 Bangarada Gudi (1976)
 Bayasade Banda Bhagya (1977)
 Nagara Hole (1977)
 Sneha Sedu (1978)
 Premayana (1978)
 Muyyige Muyyi (1978)
 Kiladi Kittu (1978)
 Hombisilu (1978)
 Priya (1979)
 Nanobba Kalla (1979) as Puttappa
 Kaadu Kudure (1979)
 Dharmasere (1979)
 Driver Hanumanthu (1980)
 Maria My Darling (1980)
 Makkala Sainya (1980)
 Bara (1980)
 Bangarada Jinke (1980)
 Simhada Mari Sainya (1981)
 Mareyada Haadu (1981)
 Guru Shishyaru (1981)
 Geetha (1981)
 Gharjane (1981)
 Tony (1982)
 Hosa Belaku (1982)
 Haalu Jenu (1982)
 Hasyaratna Ramakrishna (1982)
 Chalisuva Modagalu (1982)
 Baadada Hoo (1982)
 Pallavi Anupallavi (1983)
 Hosa Theerpu (1983)
 Eradu Nakshatragalu (1983)
 Bhakta Prahlada (1983)
 Bekkina Kannu (1984)
 Mugila Mallige (1985)
Bhagyada Lakshmi Baaramma (1986)
 Raja Kempu Roja (1990)
 Gandu Sidigundu (1991)
 Halli Rambhe Belli Bombe (1991)
 Mangalya (1991)
Dharma Durai (1991; Tamil)
 Sahasi (1992)
 Ksheera Sagara (1992)
 Prema Sangama (1992)
 Kona Edaithe (1995)
 Ammavra Ganda (1997)
 Thaayi Saheba (1997)
 Prathyartha (1999)
Yejamana (2000)
Simhadriya Simha (2002)
 Hrudayavantha (2003)
 Raja Narasimha (2003)
 Apthamitra (2004)
 Bellary Naga (2006)
 Sajni (2007)
 Ghauttham (2009)
 Breaking News (2012)
 Bhajarangi (2013)
 Shivam (2015)
 Care of Footpath 2 (2015)
 ...Re (2016)
 Mukunda Murari (2016)
 Sri Omkara Ayyappane (2016)
 Bangara s/o Bangarada Manushya (2017)
 Once More Kaurava (2017)
 Snehitha (2021)
 Drishya 2 (2021)
.Rhythm (2023)

Awards

 2013 - Padmabhushan Dr. B. Sarojadevi National Award.
 2010-11 - Dr. Rajkumar Lifetime Achievement Award from Karnataka Government.

References

External links

Shivaram filmography
Kannada filmdom's Shivaram turns 70

1938 births
2021 deaths
Indian male film actors
Indian male comedians
Male actors in Kannada cinema
Film producers from Karnataka
Kannada film producers
Kannada film directors
Male actors from Karnataka
20th-century Indian male actors
21st-century Indian male actors